Dusky Ridge is an ice-free rock ridge,  long and  wide, between Lieske Glacier and Hinton Glacier in the Britannia Range, Antarctica. The feature was named the "Dusky Mountains" by the Darwin Glacier Party of the Commonwealth Trans-Antarctic Expedition (1956–58) because of the lack of snow on its slopes. The name was amended to Dusky Ridge following remapping of the feature by the United States Geological Survey from surveys and U.S. Navy air photos, 1960–62.

References 

Ridges of Oates Land